Cluny Brown is a humorous coming of age novel by Margery Sharp, published in August 1944 by Collins in the UK and Little Brown in the US.

Plot summary

The story follows the escapades of a plumber's niece, Cluny Brown, who is twenty years old in England in 1938. Cluny has high spirits and a constant desire for expansion of experience that leads the more staid members of her community to question whether she knows her place. As a consequence of one final London based excursion of discovery outside the bounds of what Cluny's mentors consider proper, she is sent off into good service with a charming country residence known as Friars Carmel to be a Tall Parlour Maid. The coincidental simultaneous arrivals of the young son and heir of the house, a mysterious Polish professor, and a beautiful socialite add complexity to this adventurous tale of a young woman following her dreams and finding her personal freedom in the tumultuous early 20th century.

Characters

Clover 'Cluny' Brown, fearless adventurer & Tall Parlour Maid
Andrew Frewen, heir to Friars Carmel
Lady Alice Carmel, mistress of Friars Carmel
Sir Henry Carmel, baronet of Friars Carmel
Mr. Wilson, the neighborhood chemist
Adam Belinski, distinguished Pole of letters
Elizabeth 'Betty' Cream, London socialite
Hilda Brewer, house maid
Mr. Porritt, Cluny's plumber uncle
Syrette, valet

Adaptations

Films

The story was adapted into a 1946 film made by Twentieth Century-Fox, directed and produced by Ernst Lubitsch.

Comic strip

In 1945 Wallace Morgan created a newspaper comic adaptation of Cluny Brown.

References

Book reviews
 A Work In Progress
 Bibliolathas
 Another look book

1944 British novels
British novels adapted into films
British comedy novels
Novels adapted into comics
British bildungsromans
Novels set in the 1930s
Novels set in London
William Collins, Sons books
Novels by Margery Sharp